Aluminium nicotinate is a niacin derivative used as a hypolipidemic agent.

References 

Nicotinates
Aluminium compounds
3-Pyridyl compounds